The Czech Republic's official formal and short names at the United Nations are  and  in Czech, and the Czech Republic and Czechia in English. All these names derive from the name of the Czechs, the West Slavic ethnolinguistic group native to Czechia. Czechia, the official English short name specified by the Czech government, is used by many international organisations.

Attested as early as 1841, then, for example in 1856 or 1866, the word Czechia and the forms derived from it are always used by the authors synonymously with the territory of Bohemia (Kingdom of Bohemia at that time).

However, most English speakers use [the] Czech Republic in all contexts. Other languages generally have greater official use of a short form analogous to Česko or Czechia (such as French , or Russian /, or Korean /Chesŭkko or /Chekho).

The Czech name  is from the same root but means Bohemia, the westernmost and largest historical region of modern Czechia. The name Bohemia is an exonym derived from the Boii, a Celtic tribe inhabiting the area before the early Slavs arrived. The Lands of the Bohemian Crown (1348–1918) were part of the Holy Roman Empire; often called "the Czech lands", they sometimes extended further, to all of Silesia, Lusatia, and various smaller territories. The Czech adjective  means both "Czech" and "Bohemian".

The Czech Republic's official formal and short names in Czech were decided at its creation after the dissolution of Czechoslovakia in 1992.

Czech-language name
The country is named after the Czechs, a Slavic tribe residing in central Bohemia that subdued the surrounding tribes in the late 9th century and created the Czech/Bohemian state. The origin of the name of the tribe itself is unknown. According to legend, it comes from their leader Čech, who brought them to Bohemia. Research regards Čech as a derivative of the root čel- (member of the people, kinsman).

Several variants of the name have been used over the centuries, due to the evolution of the Czech language. The digraph "cž" was used from the time of the 16th-century Bible of Kralice until the reform of 1842, being eventually replaced by "č" (changing Cžechy to Čechy). In the late 19th century the suffix for the names of countries changed from -y to -sko (e.g. Rakousy → Rakousko for Austria, Uhry → Uhersko for Hungary). While the notion of Česko appears for the first time in 1704, it only came into official use in 1918 as the first part of the name of the newly independent Czechoslovakia (Česko-Slovensko or Československo) . Within that state, the Czech Socialist Republic (Česká socialistická republika, ČSR) was created on 1 January 1969. On 6 March 1990 the Czech Socialist Republic was renamed the Czech Republic (Česká republika, ČR). When Czechoslovakia broke up in 1993, the Czech part of the name was intended to serve as the name of the Czech state. The decision started a dispute as many perceived the "new" word Česko, which before had been only rarely used alone, as harsh sounding or as a remnant of Československo. The older term Čechy was rejected by many because it was primarily associated with Bohemia proper and to use it for the whole country was seen as inappropriate. This feeling was especially prominent among the inhabitants of Moravia.

The use of the word "Česko" within the country itself has increased in recent years. During the 1990s, "Česko" was rarely used and viewed as controversial. Some Czech politicians and public figures (e.g. media magnate Vladimír Železný) expressed concern about the non-use of Česko and Czechia. Václav Havel claimed that "Slugs crawl on me a little whenever I read or hear the word [Česko]." Miroslav Zikmund associated it with Hitler's Nuremberg rallies. Minister Alexandr Vondra also strongly opposed using these forms. In 1997, the Civic Initiative Czechia was formed by linguists and geographers in Brno to promote the use of Czechia. The following year, a conference of professionals aimed at encouraging the use of the name was held at Charles University in Prague. The Czech Senate held a session on the issue in 2004.

English-language name
The historical English name of the country is Bohemia. This name derives from the Celtic tribe of Boii, who inhabited the area from the 4th century BC. Boiohaemum, as it was originally known in Latin, comes from the Germanic "Boi-haima", meaning "home of the Boii". The name survived all the later migrations affecting the area, including the arrival of the Slavs and the creation of the Czech state. In the 9th century, the country became officially known as the Duchy of Bohemia, changing to the Kingdom of Bohemia in the 11th century, and the Crown of Bohemia in the 14th century. A number of other names for the country have been used, including Lands of the Bohemian Crown, Czech/Bohemian lands, Bohemian Crown, the lands of the Crown of Saint Wenceslas and others. The Bohemian state included the three historical lands: Bohemia proper (Čechy), Moravia (Morava) and Silesia (Slezsko). From the 14th century until 1635 it also included Upper and Lower Lusatia. The higher hierarchical status of the Bohemian region led to that name being used for the larger country (a linguistic device called pars pro toto), and the people and language of that country were referred to as Bohemian in English until the early 20th century.

The first known usage of the word Czechia in English comes from a book of 1841 by Henry and Thomas Rose, A New General Biographical Dictionary Projected and Partly Arranged.

Shortly before the disintegration of the Austro-Hungarian empire, there were proposals to use the traditional name Bohemia for the newly formed state. However, out of consideration for Slovak national aspirations, the name "Czecho-Slovakia" (later "Czechoslovakia") was adopted instead.

After the establishment of Czechoslovakia, the name Czechia appeared in English, alongside the official name, as a reference to all the Czech lands and to differentiate between the Czech and Slovak parts of the state. It was used at least as early as 4 January 1925; appearing in the article "Literary History of the Czechs", published by The New York Times. The name was used in the Anglophone press before the German occupation of the Czech lands in 1939.

The current English ethnonym Czech comes from the Polish ethnonym associated with the area, which ultimately comes from the Czech word Čech. The words "Czechian", "Czechish", "Czechic" and later "Czech" (using antiquated Czech spelling) have appeared in English-language texts since the 17th century. During the 19th-century national revival, the word "Czech" was also used to distinguish between the Czech- and German-speaking peoples living in the country. The term "Czechia" is attested as early as 1569 in Latin and 1841 in English (Poselkynie starych Przjbiehuw Czeskych – Messenger of the old Fates of Czechia). There were other early mentions in 1856 and in an 1866 report on the Austro-Prussian War.

Latin-language name 

Although in Latin the Bohemian lands (three historical regions of Bohemia (Čechy), Moravia (Morava), and Silesia (Slezsko) were referred to by the collective name Bohemia, based on the fact that they were part of the whole "Corona regni Bohemiae" (Bohemian Crown), in the first half of the 16th century Bohemia (proper) was referred to as Czechia, the first historically documented record of which can be found in the Chronicle of Bohemia (Kronyka Czeska) of Václav Hájek z Libočan in 1541. (Václav Hájek did not use the term in the Latin text, but in the Czech text; he replaced the present letter Č with the then-existing prefix Cž, i.e. Cžechya.

In the second half of the 16th century the name Czechia began to be commonly used in Latin and in 1598 Czechia was listed in the Bohemian(Czech)-Latin-Greek-German dictionary published by Daniel Adam z Veleslavína.

Furthermore, the designation Czechia is mentioned, for example, by Pavel Stránský ze Záp in his work Respublica Bojema from 1634, who mentions it already in his first chapter De situ qualitatibusque Bojemiae: "Europaei orbis ea regio, quam (quemadmodum Chorographis placet) inter longitudinis gradum trigesimum quartum et quintum aliquanto ultra trigesimum octavum, et inter latitudinis gradum quadragesimum octavum et nonum ad quinquagesimum primum, gens mea colit, usitato jam nomine Bojemia, seu Bohemia, et Boemia, itemque Czechia vocatur.". In Emanuel Tonner's translation, 1893: On the location and nature of the country of Bohemia: "That country in Europe, that part of the world, in which (as geographers teach) according to the longitude between the thirty-fourth and fifth degrees to the thirty-eighth, and according to the latitude between the forty-eighth and ninth degrees to the fifty-first, the Bohemians (Čechové, Czechs, i.e. Czech people) inhabit, my nation, by its usual name, is called Bohemia (Čechy, i.e. Czechia"). The description includes County of Kladsko, which belonged to Bohemia until 1742 (historical territory of Bohemia). Further east from Bohemia is Moravia.

The Latin name was later adopted into English (as well as the common "Bohemia" in the past).

Adoption of Czechia
In accordance with Resolution No. 4 I. of the UN conference on the standardization of geographic names (Geneva 1967) and Resolution No. 2 III. of the UN conference on the standardization of geographic names (Athens 1977), the Terminological Committee of the Czech Office for Surveying, Mapping, and Cadaster in cooperation with the Czech Ministry of Foreign Affairs standardized Czechia as the English translation of Česko in early 1993.

Other names suggested in the 1990s included Czechomoravia or Czechlands. However, by 2000 a short name had still not been fully adopted by the Czech authorities. At that time, Giles Portman, the Second Secretary, Press and Politics, at the British Embassy in Prague, showed a willingness to accept the name Czechia. Portman said in 2000, "Czechs still use the name Česká republika rather than Česko, and the English equivalent, the Czech Republic, rather than Czechia. Were that pattern to change, we would have no problem at all with adapting accordingly. But we feel that the initiative for that change must come from the Czech side and not from us."

The designation of the Czech Republic as Czechomoravia can also be encountered later, after 2016, in connection with efforts to promote the designation Czechia. In an open letter dated 31 December 2022, Jaroslav Krábek – president of the civic association Moravian National Community, called for the use of Czechomoravia as the name for the Czech-Moravian-Silesian area. This would be justified by the fact that the terms Čechy (Bohemia) and its variant Česko (Czechia) both have the same root. Therefore, the use of the proper name Czechia for the whole country would be to emphasise only Bohemia at the expense of Moravia. Jaroslav Krábek concludes that only the name Czechomoravia (and Czechomoravian) accurately reflects the geographical composition of the country.

In 2013, Czech president Miloš Zeman recommended the wider official use of Czechia, and on 14 April 2016 the government agreed to make Czechia the official short name. The new name was approved by the Czech cabinet on 2 May 2016 and registered on 5 July 2016. In November 2016 the Czech Ministry of Foreign Affairs presented recommendations on how to use the short name Czechia in international contexts. On 1 June 2017, the geography department of the Faculty of Sciences of Charles University in Prague organised a special conference to assess the progress of the name's proliferation.

The new short name was published in the United Nations UNTERM and UNGEGN country name databases on 17 May 2016; and is now used on name plates at the United Nations. In September 2016, the British Permanent Committee on Geographical Names (PCGN) recommended the use of Czechia and added it as the sole form of the country name to their list of country names. On 26 September 2016, the International Organization for Standardization included the short name Czechia in the official ISO 3166 country codes list. The name Czechia and its respective translations are also included in the interinstitutional style guide of the European Union and of the Council of Europe.

Multinational technology companies that adopted the name Czechia include Google, Apple, and Microsoft with Bing Maps. The business network LinkedIn updated its locations to Czechia in October 2020. Microsoft updated its Microsoft Dynamics 365 Business Central to Czechia in January 2021.

The International Ice Hockey Federation updated to Czechia in December 2021. On 28 April 2022, a conference of all sports associations was held under the patronage of the Foreign Ministry at the Czernin Palace. Following basketball, ice hockey, baseball, rugby, and association football, which started to use the short name, all remaining sports agreed to transition to the short name Czechia shortly. The Czech Football Association announced the adoption of the names Česko and Czechia on 24 May 2022.

AP Stylebook updated on 1 July 2022 online entry with the following statement: "Czechia, the Czech Republic.
Both are acceptable. The shorter name Czechia is preferred by the Czech government. If using Czechia, clarify in the story that the country is more widely known in English as the Czech Republic."

In August 2022, the United Nations list of member states was updated to Czechia and the exception of keeping the formal name on the country plates was dropped.

In September 2022, the UEFA website was updated to Czechia. NATO, the World Bank, FIFA, ISU and the Universal Postal Union switched to Czechia in October 2022.

On 1 November 2022, the Czech Olympic Committee requested the International Olympic Committee and European Olympic Committee to enter the name Czechia into their databases of countries for sports competitions. These were both adjusted.

In January 2023, The Czech Ministry of Tourism updated the website VisitCzechRepublic.com to VisitCzechia.com.

On 10 February 2023, the European Broadcasting Union (EBU), the organisers of the Eurovision Song Contest, began to refer to the country as Czechia with the name being changed on the Eurovision website. This was announced with the release of the Czech entry at the Eurovision Song Contest 2023, upon which the EBU confirmed that the country would be referred to as Czechia at the contest going forward.

See also

 Hyphen War

Notes

References

External links

Geography of the Czech Republic
Czech Republic
Names of places in Europe
Czech Republic